Ampang Park station is a metro station in Kuala Lumpur that is served by RapidKL's LRT Kelana Jaya Line and the newly-constructed MRT Putrajaya Line. The LRT station is the last underground station on the Kelana Jaya Line before the line heads above ground again at Damai LRT station. It is located opposite the site of the former Ampang Park Shopping Centre along Jalan Ampang, near the Jalan Tun Razak intersection.

The LRT station is close to the Citibank's Malaysian headquarters, as well as the US Embassy, the Singapore High Commission, the Canadian High Commission, and the British High Commission which are all located in the area of Jalan Tun Razak, known as "Embassy Row". Meanwhile, the MRT station is built at the former site of the first Malaysian shopping centre, Ampang Park Shopping Centre, located opposite Intermark Mall along the busy stretch of Jalan Tun Razak.

History
This station was opened on 1 June 1999, as Phase Two of the PUTRA LRT system, which ran from Masjid Jamek to Terminal PUTRA (Gombak). The exterior building design of the Ampang Park LRT underground station is done by NEUformation. The station shape, created as a series of inclined glass planar surfaces, implies motion in keeping with the concept of the LRT system as a future mode of transit.

Layout

Kelana Jaya Line
The station consists of three levels, with the entrance on ground level while the ticketing area, concourse and platforms are underground. Similar to all Kelana Jaya Line underground stations, the Ampang Park station features an island platform sandwiched between two railway tracks for each direction.

Putrajaya Line

Paid-to-paid interchange between the Kelana Jaya Line and the Putrajaya Line, both underground, was planned for Ampang Park station; the integration was scrapped in favour of an out-of-station interchange due to cost-cutting measures.
Passengers will have to tap out from one line, resurface to ground level, and enter the other underground station when changing between the two lines.

The MRT station's entrance will be facing Jalan Tun Razak, opposite the KL Trillion commercial development and the Jalan Tun Razak fire station.

Exits and Entrances

See also

 Rail transport in Malaysia

References

External links 
Ampang Park LRT station - mrt.com.my

Kelana Jaya Line